USS Swerve (AM-121) was an  acquired by the United States Navy for the dangerous task of removing mines from minefields laid in the water to prevent ships from passing.

Swerve was the first U.S. Navy vessel so named. It was laid down on 27 May 1942 by John H. Mathis & Company, Camden, New Jersey; launched on 25 February 1943; sponsored by Ms. E. C. Draemel; and commissioned on 23 January 1944.

Swerve held sea trials from 1–14 February and sailed for Little Creek, Virginia, on the 15th to begin her shakedown cruise. Most of March was spent in a post-shakedown availability and in training.

World War II
On 29 March, as a member of Mine Division 18 (MinDiv 18), she sailed to Charleston, South Carolina. Swerve stood out of Charleston on 7 April as an escort for convoy CK-2 en route to Bermuda. The convoy arrived there on the 18th, and on 8 May sailed to the Azores. Swerve called at Gibraltar and proceeded to Naples, Italy.

Italian coast minesweeping operations
The minesweeper sailed for Palermo, Sicily on 20 May and arrived there the next day. She made a voyage to Bizerte and returned to Naples. The ship sailed for Anzio on 4 June, and arrived off the beach the next day.

Swerve remained off Anzio from 5–18 June. The ship was under enemy air attacks on the 5th and 9th but was not damaged. On the 19th, she sailed to Malta — via Naples — for degaussing. Training exercises were held off Salerno from 22 June-4 July. The next day, the minesweeper sailed for Anzio again.

Ship sunk by contact with a mine in the water
Swerve was sweeping mines off Anzio on 9 July when, at 13:00, she struck a mine. There was an underwater explosion under her port quarter, and three minutes later, she had a 10° list to port. The order was given to abandon ship at 13:07, and — one minute later — the port rail was under water. The ship continued turning slowly and sinking by the stern. Fifteen minutes after hitting the mine, Swerves bow was up with the stern resting on the bottom. An hour later, the ship sank from sight.

Swerve was struck from the Naval Vessel Register on 22 August 1944.

Awards
Swerve received one battle star for her World War II service.

References

External links
Ships of the U.S. Navy, 1940-1945 AM-121 USS Swerve
Photo gallery at navsource.org
 uss-swerve.com, a site for veterans and families of the USS Swerve AM-121

 

Auk-class minesweepers of the United States Navy
Ships built by John H. Mathis & Company
1943 ships
World War II minesweepers of the United States
World War II shipwrecks in the Mediterranean Sea
Maritime incidents in July 1944
Ships sunk by mines